Erik Bánki (born May 26, 1970) is a Hungarian politician, member of the National Assembly (MP) from 1998 to 2012 and since 2014.

He served as Chairman of the Parliamentary Committee on Sport and Tourism from May 14, 2010, to June 10, 2012. He is a Member of Board of the Hungarian Football Federation from 2009.

Bánki became Member of the European Parliament (MEP) on June 10, 2012, replacing János Áder, who was elected President of Hungary in May 2012. As a result, Bánki had to resign from his national parliamentary seat. He was re-elected Hungarian MP in the 2014 parliamentary election. He became Chairman of the Parliamentary Committee on Economics in October 2015. Bánki was re-elected MP via the joint national list of Fidesz-KDNP during the 2018 parliamentary election.

Personal life
Bánki is divorced and is the father of 4 children.

References

1970 births
Living people
Fidesz politicians
Fidesz MEPs
MEPs for Hungary 2009–2014
Members of the National Assembly of Hungary (1998–2002)
Members of the National Assembly of Hungary (2002–2006)
Members of the National Assembly of Hungary (2006–2010)
Members of the National Assembly of Hungary (2010–2014)
Members of the National Assembly of Hungary (2014–2018)
Members of the National Assembly of Hungary (2018–2022)
Members of the National Assembly of Hungary (2022–2026)
People from Szekszárd